Xenon oxydifluoride is an inorganic compound with the molecular formula XeOF2. The first definitive isolation of the compound was published on 3 March 2007, producing it by the previously-examined route of partial hydrolysis of xenon tetrafluoride.

The compound has a T-shaped geometry and does not form polymers, though it does form an adduct with acetonitrile and with hydrogen fluoride.

Although stable at low temperatures, it rapidly decomposes upon warming, either by losing the oxygen atom or by disproportionating into xenon difluoride and xenon dioxydifluoride:

References 

Xenon(IV) compounds
Oxyfluorides
Substances discovered in the 2000s